John Denny (May 4, 1793 – July 28, 1875) was an American pioneer and politician.

Born in Mercer County, Kentucky, Denny served in the Kentucky Volunteers regiment during the War of 1812. In 1816, Denny, his wife, and family moved to Washington County, Indiana and then to Putnam County, Indiana. Then, in 1835, Denny, his wife, and family settled in Knox County, Illinois. While living in Knox County, Illinois Denny served as justice of the peace. From 1840 to 1842, Denny served in the Illinois House of Representatives. He was a Whig and then a Republican. He settled in Seattle, Washington where he died. His son was Arthur A. Denny.

John Street in Seattle was named after Denny by his sons.

Notes

External links

1793 births
1875 deaths
People from Mercer County, Kentucky
People from Putnam County, Illinois
People from Washington County, Illinois
People from Knox County, Illinois
Politicians from Seattle
People from Kentucky in the War of 1812
Illinois Whigs
Illinois Republicans
Members of the Illinois House of Representatives